Eulepidotis philosis is a moth of the family Erebidae first described by William Schaus in 1921. It is found in the Neotropics, including Guatemala.

References

Moths described in 1921
philosis